Kohanabad Rural District is a rural district (dehestan) in Kohanabad District, Aradan County, Semnan Province, Iran. At the 2006 census, its population (including those portions split off in 2011 to form Faravan Rural District) was 4,745, in 1,392 families; excluding those portions, the population (as of 2006) was 3,411, in 993 families.  The rural district has 12 villages.

References 

Rural Districts of Semnan Province
Aradan County